The Venice Ladies Open was a golf tournament on the LPGA Tour from 1966 to 1967. It was played at the Lake Venice Golf Club in Venice, Florida.

Winners
1967 Kathy Whitworth
1966 Mickey Wright

References

Former LPGA Tour events
Golf in Florida
Women's sports in Florida
Venice, Florida